Kasaï was a province of the Belgian Congo and the successor Republic of the Congo (Léopoldville).

Location

Kasaï was named after the Kasai River, a major left tributary of the Congo River that provides access to the region.
By 1910 a  factory of the Kasai Company had been established near Misumba, which had  about two thousand inhabitants.
The company had made successful trial rubber plantations.
The company also bought rubber and ivory from the local people, some of whom used it to buy liquor from the Portuguese territory (Angola).

History

In 1914 the Belgian Congo was organized into four large provinces: Congo-Kasai, Équateur, Orientale Province and Katanga.
in 1933 they were reorganized into six provinces, named after their capitals, and the central government assumed more control.
Congo-Kasai was divided into the new provinces of Léopoldville and Lusambo, named after the city of Lusambo.
In 1947 Lusambo Province was renamed to Kasaï.

Kasaï became an autonomous province of the Congo republic on 30 June 1960. 
On 14 August 1962 Kasaï was divided into five new provinces: Lomami, Luluabourg, Sankuru, Sud-Kasaï and Unité Kasaïenne.
On 25 April 1966 Luluabourg and Unité Kasaïenne were united to form Kasaï-Occidental, while Lomami, Sankuru, and Sud-Kasaï were united in the new province of Kasaï-Oriental.

See also

List of governors of Kasaï (former province)
History of the Kasai region

Notes

Sources

Provinces of the Belgian Congo
Former provinces of the Democratic Republic of the Congo (pre-1966)